Overprinting refers to the process of printing one colour on top of another in reprographics. This is closely linked to the reprographic technique of 'trapping'. Another use of overprinting is to create a rich black (often regarded as a colour that is "blacker than black") by printing black over another dark colour.

It is also the term used in the production of envelopes customised to order by printing images (such as logos) and texts (such as slogans) on mass-produced machine-made envelopes; the alternative way of producing such envelopes is to print "on the flat" and then cut out the individual shapes and fold them to form the envelopes. However the latter method is generally only economically viable for large print runs offering returns to scale.

Overprinting also refers to the printing of additional information onto self-adhesive labels and product packaging. "Best Before", "Use By" dates and batch codes are printed in situ onto product
packaging as the items are packed. Generally thermal printers, ink jet printers or laser printers are used.

References

Printing terminology
Envelopes